In algebraic number theory, a supersingular prime for a given elliptic curve is a prime number with a certain relationship to that curve.  If the curve E is defined over the rational numbers, then a prime p is supersingular for E if the reduction of E modulo p is a supersingular elliptic curve over the residue field Fp.

Noam Elkies showed that every elliptic curve over the rational numbers has infinitely many supersingular primes. As of 2019, this conjecture is open.

More generally, if K is any global field—i.e., a finite extension either of Q or of Fp(t)—and A is an abelian variety defined over K, then a supersingular prime  for A is a finite place of K such that the reduction of A modulo  is a supersingular abelian variety.

References 

Classes of prime numbers
Algebraic number theory
Unsolved problems in number theory